The Live Wire is a 1917 British short silent comedy film directed by George Dewhurst and starring Ronald Colman and Phyllis Titmuss. It marked the screen debut of Colman, who would go on to become a leading Hollywood star. It is now a lost film.

References

Bibliography
 Schildgen, Rachel A. More Than A Dream: Rediscovering the Life and Films of Vilma Banky. 1921 PVG Publishing, 2010.

External links
 

1917 films
1917 comedy films
British silent short films
Films directed by George Dewhurst
Lost British films
British black-and-white films
British comedy short films
1917 lost films
Lost comedy films
1910s English-language films
1910s British films
Silent comedy films
English-language comedy films